Reynaldo Garcia (born April 15, 1974 in Nayua, Dominican Republic) is a former Major League Baseball pitcher who played for the Texas Rangers from -.

Garcia spent all of the  season on the disabled list and played for the independent Lancaster Barnstormers of the Atlantic League in the  season.

External links

1974 births
Living people
Charlotte Rangers players
Dominican Republic expatriate baseball players in the United States
Gulf Coast Rangers players
Lancaster Barnstormers players

Major League Baseball pitchers
Major League Baseball players from the Dominican Republic
Oklahoma RedHawks players
Savannah Sand Gnats players
Texas Rangers players
Tulsa Drillers players